The Entdeckungsfels is a minor summit that is located in Switzerland, west of the Lysjoch very close to the Italian border, between Liskamm and Ludwigshöhe. Because of its small prominence, it was included in the enlarged list of alpine four-thousanders.

References

External links
Entdeckungsfels on Hikr

Alpine four-thousanders
Mountains of the Alps
Mountains of Switzerland
Pennine Alps
Mountains of Valais
Four-thousanders of Switzerland